Nehru Memorial College (NMC) is located in Kurunjibag, Sullia of Karnataka state of India, is a government aided college serving students seeking under graduation and post graduation courses. This college is the premier institution under Academy of Liberal Education (R.) Sullia.

The college is accredited with 'B+' grade by National Assessment and Accreditation Council.

The college provides following Under Graduation courses :
Bachelor of Arts
Bachelor of Science
Bachelor of Commerce
Bachelor of Business Administration
Bachelor of Social Works
Master of Social Works
Master of Commerce

Extra curricular activities
 NCC - National Cadet Corps
 NSS - National Service Scheme
 Rovers & Rangers
 YRC - Youth Red Cross

History
The main visionary behind this college is Sri Kurunji Venkatramana Gowda, popularly known as the "Architect of Modern Sullia" is also the Founder President of the Academy of Liberal Education. The Academy of Liberal Education is a Registered Society established in 1976 with the sole objective of providing quality education in all branches including professional courses.

Campus
The college campus is called Kurunjibag.

Nehru Memorial Pre-University College
 PUC Arts
 PUC Commerce
 PUC Science

See also
Sullia
KVG College of Engineering
Mangalore University

References

External links 
 Academy Of Liberal Education (AOLE)

Universities and colleges in Mangalore
Monuments and memorials to Jawaharlal Nehru
1976 establishments in Karnataka
Educational institutions established in 1976